Hacılar is a village in the Karlıova District, Bingöl Province, Turkey. The village is populated by Kurds of the Bekiran and Şukuran tribes and had a population of 1,002 in 2021.

References 

Villages in Karlıova District
Kurdish settlements in Bingöl Province